Pontoporeia is a genus of fungi in the family Zopfiaceae.

References

Pleosporales